God's Word Is Our Great Heritage, is the title of a popular hymn sung in many churches, especially the Lutheran Church.  This hymn was inspired by Psalm 16:6: "...yea, I have a goodly heritage." KJV

History 

God's Word Is Our Great Heritage was written in 1817 by N. F. S. Grundtvig, a Danish Lutheran Pastor.  Gruntvig wrote the hymn as the 5th verse to Martin Luther's Ein feste Burg .  The hymn was translated into English by Ole Gulbrand Belsheim in 1909.  In 1916,  Friedrich Otto Reuter, then a professor at Dr. Martin Luther College, put the hymn to a tune of his creation.  Many hymnals use this arrangement, including The Lutheran Hymnal, Lutheran Service Book (LCMS) and Christian Worship: A Lutheran Hymnal (WELS), though the Evangelical Lutheran Hymnary (ELS) has retained the original melody to the hymn.  The hymn is also the school hymn of Michigan Lutheran Seminary.

Text

References 

Cyber Hymnal
Evangelical Lutheran Hymnary Handbook

External links 
God's Word Is Our Great Heritage sung by the Michigan Lutheran Seminary Choir

Danish Christian hymns
Lutheran hymns
19th-century hymns